In the mathematical subfield of numerical analysis the symbolic Cholesky decomposition is an algorithm used to determine the non-zero pattern for the  factors of a symmetric sparse matrix when applying the Cholesky decomposition or variants.

Algorithm
Let

In order to implement an efficient sparse factorization it has been found to be necessary to determine the non zero structure of the factors before doing any numerical work. To write the algorithm down we use the following notation:

 Use a parent function  to define the elimination tree within the matrix.

The following algorithm gives an efficient 
symbolic factorization of  : 

 

Articles with example pseudocode
Matrix decompositions